I Know Why the Caged Bird Sings is an American television film based on the autobiography of the same name by Maya Angelou, first aired April 28, 1979 on CBS. Angelou and Leonora Thuna wrote the screenplay, and the movie was directed by Fielder Cook. Constance Good played the young Maya Angelou. Also appearing were Esther Rolle, Roger E. Mosley, Diahann Carroll, Ruby Dee, and Madge Sinclair. Filming took place in Vicksburg, Mississippi.

The movie traces Maya's life from when she and her brother move in with their grandmother to the trauma of being raped as a young girl by one of her mother's boyfriends and the several years of silence that came after the attack.

Two scenes in the movie differed from events described in the book. Angelou added a scene between Maya and Uncle Willie after the Joe Louis fight. In it, he expresses his feelings of redemption after Louis defeats a white opponent. Angelou also presents her eighth-grade graduation differently in the film. In the book, Henry Reed delivers the valedictory speech and leads the black audience in the Negro national anthem. In the movie, Maya conducts these activities.

Cast
(in credits order)
 Paul Benjamin ...  Freeman
 Diahann Carroll ...  Vivian
 Ruby Dee ...  Grandmother Baxter
 Roger E. Mosley ...  Bailey Sr.
 Esther Rolle ...  Momma
 Madge Sinclair ...  Miss Flowers
 Constance Good ...  Maya Angelou
 John Driver ...  Bailey Jr. (as John M. Driver II)
 Sonny Jim Gaines ...  Uncle Willie
 Art Evans ...  Principal
 J. Don Ferguson ...  Mr. Donleavy
 Georgia Allen ...  Mrs. Gurney
 Darleen Taylor ...  1st Girl
 Darryl Antony Williams ...  Tommy Valdon (as Darryl Williams)
 Tonea Stewart ...  Lillie (as Tommie Stewart)
 Shaunery Stevens ...  Policeman
 Monica Kyles ...  Julie
 Frankie Mitchell ...  2nd Mrs. Fletcher
 Rick Salassi ...  Parmenian (as Richard Salassi)
 Lewis Liddell ...  Tommy
 Sammy Liddell ...  Ira
 Sylvester Spann ...  Tutti
 Hosie Phillips ...  Preacher
 Myra Jo Arvin ...  Red
 George Cummins ...  Sheriff Rogers
 Torain ...  Teacher
 Laurie Waters ...  Tall Girl
 Mose Lee Williams ...  1st Mrs. Fletcher
 M.L. Breeland ...  Mr. Peters
 Angela Brown ...  Kitty
 Abbie Burns ...  Mary
 Johnny Lewis ...  1st Picker
 John L. Patterson ...  Man
 James Peters ...  2nd Man
 Melvin Kennerly ...  3rd Man
 Shirley Perkins ...  Woman
 John C. Roper Jr. ...  White Man
 Terri Ann Ross ...  Small Girl
 I.D. Thompson ...  Black Man

External links
 

1979 television films
1979 films
1970s biographical drama films
CBS network films
Films based on biographies
Films directed by Fielder Cook
African-American biographical dramas
1970s English-language films
Maya Angelou
American drama television films
1970s American films